The 1978 Men's EuroHockey Nations Championship was the third edition of the Men's EuroHockey Nations Championship, the quadrennial international men's field hockey championship of Europe organized by the European Hockey Federation. It was held in Hanover, West Germany from 2 to 10 September 1978.

The hosts West Germany won their second title by defeating the Netherlands 3–2 after extra time in the final. England won the bronze medal by defeating the defending champions Spain 2–0.

Preliminary round

Pool A

Pool B

Classification round

Ninth to twelfth place classification

9–12th place semi-finals

Eleventh place game

Ninth place game

Fifth to eighth place classification

5–8th place semi-finals

Seventh place game

Fifth place game

First to fourth place classification

Semi-finals

Third place game

Final

Final standings

References

Men's EuroHockey Nations Championship
EuroHockey Nations Championship
EuroHockey Nations Championship
International field hockey competitions hosted by Germany
Sports competitions in Hanover
EuroHockey Nations Championship
20th century in Hanover